Veera Baranova (born 12 February 1984) is an Estonian triple jumper.

Achievements

References

1984 births
Living people
Estonian female triple jumpers
Competitors at the 2003 Summer Universiade
Competitors at the 2005 Summer Universiade